Lychee (Litchi chinensis) is a monotypic taxon and the sole member in the genus Litchi in the soapberry family, Sapindaceae.

It is a tropical tree native to South China. The tree has been introduced throughout Southeast Asia and South Asia. Cultivation in China is documented from the 11th century. China is the main producer of lychees, followed by Vietnam, India, other countries in Southeast Asia, other countries in the Indian subcontinent, Madagascar, and South Africa. A tall evergreen tree, the lychee bears small fleshy fruits. The outside of the fruit is pink-red, roughly textured, and inedible, covering sweet flesh eaten in many different dessert dishes.

Lychee seeds contain methylene cyclopropyl glycine which has caused hypoglycemia associated with outbreaks of encephalopathy in undernourished Indian and Vietnamese children who consumed lychee fruit.

Taxonomy 

Litchi chinensis  is the sole member of the genus Litchi in the soapberry family, Sapindaceae.

It was described and named by French naturalist Pierre Sonnerat in his account "Voyage aux Indes Orientales et à la Chine, fait depuis 1774 jusqu'à 1781" (translation: "Voyage to the East Indies and China, made between 1774 and 1781"), which was published in 1782. There are three subspecies, determined by flower arrangement, twig thickness, fruit, and a number of stamens.
 Litchi chinensis subsp. chinensis is the only commercialized lychee. It grows wild in southern China, northern Vietnam, and Cambodia.
 Litchi chinensis subsp. philippinensis (Radlk.) Leenh. It is common in the wild in the Philippines and rarely cultivated.
 Litchi chinensis subsp. javensis. It is only known in cultivation, in Malaysia and Indonesia.

Description

Tree 
Its evergreen leaves, 5 to 8 in (12.5–20 cm) long, are pinnate, having 4 to 8 alternate, elliptic-oblong to lanceolate, abruptly pointed, leaflets,

The bark is grey-black, the branches a brownish-red. Lychee are similar in foliage to the family Lauraceae, likely due to convergent evolution. They are adapted by developing leaves that repel water, and are called laurophyll or lauroid leaves.

Flowers grow on a terminal inflorescence with many panicles on the current season's growth. The panicles grow in clusters of ten or more, reaching  or longer, holding hundreds of small white, yellow, or green flowers that are distinctively fragrant.

Fruit 

The lychee bears fleshy fruits that mature in 80–112 days depending on climate, location, and cultivar. Fruits vary in shape from round to ovoid to heart-shaped, up to 5 cm long and 4 cm wide (2.0 in × 1.6 in), weighing approximately 20 g.

The thin, tough skin is green when immature, ripening to red or pink-red, and is smooth or covered with small sharp protuberances roughly textured. The rind is inedible but easily removed to expose a layer of translucent white fleshy aril with a floral smell and a sweet flavor. The skin turns brown and dry when left out after harvesting.

The fleshy, edible portion of the fruit is an aril, surrounding one dark brown inedible seed that is 1 to 3.3 cm long and 0.6 to 1.2 cm wide (0.39–1.30 by 0.24–0.47 in). Some cultivars produce a high percentage of fruits with shriveled aborted seeds known as 'chicken tongues'. These fruits typically have a higher price, due to having more edible flesh. Since the floral flavor is lost in the process of canning, the fruit is usually eaten fresh.

History 

Cultivation of lychee began in the region of southern China, going back to 1059 AD, Malaysia, and northern Vietnam. Unofficial records in China refer to lychee as far back as 2000 BC. Wild trees still grow in parts of southern China and on Hainan Island. The fruit was used as a delicacy in the Chinese Imperial Court.

In the 1st century during the Han dynasty, fresh lychees were a popular tribute item, and in such demand at the Imperial Court that a special courier service with fast horses would bring the fresh fruit from Guangdong. There was great demand for lychee in the Song Dynasty (960-1279), according to Cai Xiang, in his Li chi pu (Treatise on Lychees). It was also the favorite fruit of Emperor Li Longji (Xuanzong)'s favored concubine Yang Yuhuan (Yang Guifei).  The emperor had the fruit delivered at great expense to the capital.

The lychee attracted the attention of European travelers, such as the Spanish bishop, explorer, and sinologist Juan González de Mendoza in his History of the great and mighty kingdom of China (1585; English translation 1588), based on the reports of Spanish friars who had visited China in the 1570s gave the fruit high praise:

Later the lychee was described and introduced to the West in 1656 by Michal Boym, a Polish Jesuit missionary (at that time Polish–Lithuanian Commonwealth).

Lychee was introduced in the Pakistani region (then British Raj) in 1932 and remained an exotic plant until the 1960s when commercial production began. The crop's production expanded from Begum Kot (Lahore District) in Punjab to Hazara, Haripur, and Mirpur Khas.

Double domestication 
Genomic studies indicate that the lychee resulted from double domestication by independent cultivation in two different regions of ancient China.

Cultivation and uses 

Lychees are extensively grown in southern China, Taiwan, Vietnam and the rest of tropical Southeast Asia, the Indian Subcontinent, and in tropical regions of many other countries. Lychees require a climate with high summer heat, rainfall, and humidity, growing optimally on well-drained, slightly acidic soils rich in organic matter and mulch.

Some 200 cultivars exist, with early and late maturing forms suited to warmer and cooler climates, respectively, although mainly eight cultivars are used for commerce in China. They are also grown as an ornamental tree, as well as for their fruit. The most common way of propagating lychee is through a method called air layering or marcotting. Air-layers, or marcotts, are made by cutting a branch of a mature tree, covering the cut with a rooting medium, such as peat or sphagnum moss, then wrapping the medium with polyethylene film and allowing the cut to root. Once significant rooting has occurred, the marcott is cut from the branch and potted.

According to folklore, a lychee tree that is not producing much fruit can be girdled, leading to more fruit production. When the central opening of trees is carried out as part of training and pruning, stereo fruiting can be achieved for higher orchard productivity.

Lychees are commonly sold fresh in Asian markets. The red rind turns dark brown when the fruit is refrigerated, but the taste isn't affected. It is also sold canned year-round. The fruit can be dried with the rind intact, at which point the flesh shrinks and darkens.

Cultivars 

There are numerous lychee cultivars, with considerable confusion regarding their naming and identification. The same cultivar grown in different climates can produce very different fruit. Cultivars can also have different synonyms in various parts of the world. Southeast Asian countries, along with Australia, use the original Chinese names for the main cultivars. India grows more than a dozen different cultivars. South Africa grows mainly the “Mauritius” cultivar. Most cultivars grown in the United States were imported from China, except for the “Groff”, which was developed in the state of Hawaii.

Different cultivars of lychee are popular in various growing regions and countries. In China, popular cultivars include Sanyuehong, Baitangying, Baila, Shuidong, Feizixiao, Dazou, Heiye, Nuomici, Guiwei, Huaizhi, Lanzhu, and Chenzi. In Vietnam, the most popular cultivar is Vai Thieu Hai Duong. In the US, production is based on several cultivars, including Mauritius, Brewster, and Hak Ip. India grows more than a dozen named cultivars, including Shahi (Highest Pulp %), Dehradun, Early Large Red, Kalkattia and Rose Scented.

Nutrients 

Raw lychee fruit is 82% water, 17% carbohydrates, 1% protein, and contains negligible fat (table). In a 100-gram (3.5 oz) reference amount, raw lychee fruit supplies 66 calories of food energy. The raw pulp is rich in vitamin C, having 72 mg per 100 grams – an amount representing 86% of the Daily Value – but contains no other micronutrients in significant content (table).

Phytochemicals 
Lychees have moderate amounts of polyphenols, including flavan-3-ol monomers and dimers as major compounds representing about 87% of total polyphenols, which declined in content during storage or browning. Lychees naturally produce butylated hydroxytoluene. Cyanidin-3-glucoside represented 92% of total anthocyanins.

Poisoning 
In 1962, it was found that lychee seeds contained methylenecyclopropylglycine (MCPG), a homologue of hypoglycin A, which caused hypoglycemia in animal studies. 
Since the end of the 1990s, unexplained outbreaks of encephalopathy occurred, appearing to affect only children in India (where it is called chamki bukhar), and northern Vietnam (where it was called Ac Mong encephalitis after the Vietnamese word for nightmare) during the lychee harvest season from May to June.

A 2013 investigation by the U.S. Centers for Disease Control and Prevention (CDC), in India, showed that cases were linked to the consumption of lychee fruit, causing a noninflammatory encephalopathy that mimicked symptoms of Jamaican vomiting sickness. Because low blood sugar (hypoglycemia) of less than 70 mg/dL in the undernourished children on admission was common, and associated with a poorer outcome (44% of all cases were fatal) the CDC identified the illness as a hypoglycemic encephalopathy.

The investigation linked the illness to hypoglycin A and MCPG toxicity, and to malnourished children eating lychees (particularly unripe ones) on an empty stomach.

The CDC report recommended that parents ensure their children limit lychee consumption and have an evening meal, elevating blood glucose levels that may be sufficient to deter illness.

Earlier studies had incorrectly concluded that transmission may occur from direct contact with lychees contaminated by bat saliva, urine, or guano or with other vectors, such as insects found in lychee trees or sand flies, as in the case of Chandipura virus. A 2017 study found that pesticides used in the plantations could be responsible for the encephalitis and deaths of young children in Bangladesh.

Gallery

See also 

 Ackee
 China 3 lychee
 Chinese food therapy
 Guinep (Melicoccus bijugatus)
 Korlan
 Lanzones
 Lichido liqueur
 List of culinary fruits
 Longan
 Lychee wine
 Muzaffarpur
 Rambutan

References

Further reading 

 
 
 
 

Sapindaceae
Trees of China
Trees of Indo-China
Trees of Malesia
Chinese fruit
Edible fruits
Fruit trees
Tropical fruit
Plants described in 1782